The 1984 Bordeaux Open also known as the Grand Prix Passing Shot was a men's tennis tournament played on outdoor clay courts at Villa Primrose in Bordeaux, France that was part of the 1984 Volvo Grand Prix. It was the sixth edition of the tournament and was held from 17 September until 21 September 1984. Third-seeded José Higueras won the singles title.

Finals

Singles
 José Higueras defeated  Francesco Cancellotti 7–6, 6–1
 It was Higueras' 2nd singles title of the year and the 16th and last of his career.

Doubles
 Pavel Složil /  Blaine Willenborg defeated  Loïc Courteau /  Guy Forget 6–1, 6–4

References

External links
 ITF tournament edition details

Bordeaux Open
ATP Bordeaux
Bordeaux Open
Bordeaux Open